Riverside Walk is a 4.6-hectare Local Nature Reserve on the western outskirts of Hadleigh in Suffolk. It is owned and managed by Babergh District Council.

This linear site on the west bank of the River Brett comprises two footpaths and the alder woodland and fen between them. Great willowherb and meadowsweet grow in marshy silted up ditches, and birds include warblers and finches.

There is access from Corks Lane and Duke Street.

References

Local Nature Reserves in Suffolk
Hadleigh, Suffolk